James J. Baldwin (1888–1955), commonly known as J.J. Baldwin, was an American architect who designed numerous courthouse buildings and other works in several U.S. states. His most spectacular work is the Cherokee County Courthouse located in the farthest west corner of North Carolina.

He graduated from the University of South Carolina in 1907 and also studied architecture at the University of Pennsylvania.

For various periods he worked in Anderson, South Carolina, in Asheville, North Carolina, in Chattanooga, Tennessee, and in Washington, D.C.

A number of his works are listed on the National Register of Historic Places.

Works include:
One or more works in Anderson Downtown Historic District (boundary increase), 402 N. Main St., Anderson, SC (Baldwin, James J.), NRHP-listed
Atkinson County Courthouse, Austin at Main St., Pearson, GA (Baldwin, J.J.), NRHP-listed
Bacon County Courthouse, Main St., Alma, GA (Baldwin, J.J.), NRHP-listed
Baldwin-Coker Cottage, 226 Lower Lake Rd., Highlands, NC (Baldwin, James John), NRHP-listed
Bank of French Broad, 100 Main St., Marshall, NC (Baldwin, James J.), NRHP-listed
Barrow County Courthouse, Courthouse Sq., Winder, GA (Baldwin, J.J.; Wimbish, R.W.), NRHP-listed
Candler County Courthouse, Courthouse Sq., Metter, GA (Baldwin, J.J.), NRHP-listed
Cherokee County Courthouse, Peachtree and Central Sts., Murphy, NC (Baldwin, James J.), NRHP-listed
Evans County Courthouse, Courthouse Sq., Claxton, GA (Baldwin, J.J.), NRHP-listed
First Methodist Church of St. Petersburg, 212 Third St., N, St. Petersburg, FL (Baldwin, James J.), NRHP-listed
Lee County Courthouse, Courthouse Sq., Leesburg, GA (Baldwin, J.J.), NRHP-listed
Liberty County Courthouse, Courthouse Sq., Hinesville, GA (Baldwin, J.J.), NRHP-listed
One or more works in Main Street Historic District, roughly bounded by Blanton Alley, Huntley St., Yarboro St., and Broadway St., Forest City, NC (Baldwin, James J.), NRHP-listed
One or more works in Marshall Main Street Historic District, 101 N. Main St.- 165 S. Main St., Bridge St. and 33 Bailey's Branch Rd., Marshall, NC (Baldwin, James J.), NRHP-listed
One or more works in Rochelle Historic District, centered on 1st Ave and Ashley St., Rochelle, GA (Baldwin, James J.), NRHP-listed
Emory Edward Satterfield House, 504 W. Howell St., Hartwell, GA (Baldwin, James J.), NRHP-listed 
Treutlen County Courthouse, Courthouse Sq., Soperton, GA (Baldwin, J.J.), NRHP-listed

References

20th-century American architects
University of South Carolina alumni
1888 births
1955 deaths
University of Pennsylvania School of Design alumni